Rupela orbona is a moth in the family Crambidae. It was described by Carl Heinrich in 1937. It is found in Guyana.

The wingspan is about 30 mm. The wings are white.

References

Moths described in 1937
Schoenobiinae
Taxa named by Carl Heinrich